Forever Plaid: The Movie (also titled Forever Plaid: The 20th Anniversary Special) is a 2008 American jukebox musical film, a recording of a live performance of a revival to the 1990 Off-Broadway musical revue Forever Plaid. Written and directed by Stuart Ross, the film stars Stan Chandler, David Engel, Larry Raben, and Daniel Reichard and is narrated by David Hyde Pierce. The performance was filmed at CBS Columbia Square in Los Angeles, California. It was released by National CineMedia on July 9, 2009.

Cast
Stan Chandler as Jinx
David Engel as Smudge
Larry Raben as Sparky
Daniel Reichard as Francis
Traci Bingham as an usher (scenes deleted)
Jo Anne Worley as an usher (scenes deleted)
Rogina Gosch - Señorita Casabas

External links
 
Forever Plaid: The Movie news at Broadway World.com
Forever Plaid: The Movie review at Broadway World.com
 Forever Plaid: The Movie images at gettyimages
 Forever Plaid: The Movie home page
 Forever Plaid: The Movie at Playbill News
 Forever Plaid: The Movie at THEATER MANIA

2008 films
American films based on plays
American musical comedy films
2000s musical comedy films
2008 comedy films
2000s English-language films
2000s American films